The Gascoyne Marine Park (formerly known as the Gascoyne Commonwealth Marine Reserve) is an Australian marine park offshore of Western Australia, west of the Cape Range Peninsula. The park is assigned IUCN category IV and is one of the 13 parks managed under the North-west Marine Parks Network.

Conservation values

Species and habitat
Foraging areas for vulnerable and migratory whale sharks.
Foraging areas and adjacent to important nesting sites for marine turtles
Includes part of the migratory pathway of the protected humpback whale.

Bioregions and ecology
The reserve includes shallow shelf environments and provides protection for shelf and slope habitats, as well as pinnacle and terrace seafloor features
Examples of the seafloor habitats and communities of the Central Western Shelf Transition provincial bioregion.

History
The marine park was proclaimed under the EPBC Act on 14 December 2013 and renamed Gascoyne Marine Park on 9 October 2017. The management plan and protection measures of the marine park came into effect for the first time on 1 July 2018.

Summary of protection zones
The Gascoyne Marine Park has been assigned IUCN protected area category IV. However, within the marine park there are three protection zones, each zone has an IUCN category and related rules for managing activities to ensure the protection of marine habitats and species.

The following table is a summary of the zoning rules within the Gascoyne Marine Park:

See also

 Protected areas managed by the Australian government

References

External links
 North-west Marine Parks Network - Parks Australia
 North-west Marine Parks Network - environment.gov.au (outdated)

Australian marine parks